Gauromyrmex is a genus of ants in the subfamily Myrmicinae. The genus contains two species, known from the Indomalayan realm. According to Bolton (2003), there are a further five or six undescribed species in the collections of the Natural History Museum in London.

Species
Gauromyrmex acanthinus (Karavaiev, 1935)
Gauromyrmex bengakalisi Menozzi, 1933

References

External links

Myrmicinae
Ant genera
Hymenoptera of Asia